Shahrokndin may refer to:

 Monument of Shahrokndin
 Bath of Shah Rokn al-Din, also known as Bath of Shahrokndin